The 2022 Stetson Hatters football team represented Stetson University  as a member of the Pioneer Football League (PFL) during the 2022 NCAA Division I FCS football season. They were led by second-year head coach Brian Young and played their home games at Spec Martin Stadium in DeLand, Florida.

Previous season

The Hatters finished the 2021 season 4–7, 2–6 in PFL play to finish in eighth place.

Schedule

 Stetson had a game schedule against San Diego, slated for October 1. The game was later canceled days before the game due to Hurricane Ian.

Game summaries

Concordia (MI)

Louisiana Christian

Princeton

Morehead State

Marist

at Dayton

Drake

at Davidson

at St. Thomas (MN)

Presbyterian

References

Stetson
Stetson Hatters football seasons
Stetson Hatters football